Qaumi Watan Party ( or), abbreviated as QWP and formerly called Pakistan Peoples Party–Sherpao (PPP–S), is one of the prominent political parties in Pakistan, that split away from the Pakistan Peoples Party just before the 2002 general election. PPP–S was named after its leader Aftab Ahmad Sherpao. Differences had cropped up between PPP Chairperson Benazir Bhutto and Senior Leader Aftab Ahmad Sherpao in 1999 and the latter was expelled from the PPP by the former, thus creating PPP–S. In October 2012, it was renamed to Qaumi Watan Party when it changed its political agenda and declared itself as a Pashtun neo-nationalist party.

Name change
The name and manifesto of the party were formally changed on October 17, 2012. It was renamed from "Pakistan Peoples Party–Sherpao" to "Qaumi Watan Party". The tri-color flag was also changed by replacing the green color with white. Aftab Ahmad Sherpao said Qaumi Watan Party will work for rights of the Pashtuns of the entire region, including Khyber Pakhtunkhwa, Karachi, Balochistan and the Federally Administered Tribal Areas.

Overview
At the legislative elections of 20 October 2002, Pakistan Peoples Party–Sherpao won 0.3% of the popular vote and 2 out of 272 elected members. In the 2008 general election, the party won only 1 seat in the National Assembly, in which the party leader Aftab Sherpao was successful. On the other hand, it won 6 provincial assembly seats, all in Khyber-Pakhtunkhwa province.

During the 2013 elections the party rebranded itself as the Qaumi Watan Party and Sherpao once again won the National seat, provincially the party secured 10 seats in total, of which 8 were directly elected. This made the Qaumi Watan Party the fourth largest party in the KPK Assembly and a ally of PTI-led government coalition.

Flag
The tricolor red-black-white flag of the party exactly resembles the flag of the Kingdom of Afghanistan during the regime of Emir Habibullah Kalakani (January 1929 – October 1929). The same colors were also used by the Mongols when occupying present-day Afghanistan in the 13th century.

QWP-PTI relationship
The QWP initially joined the coalition government in the KPK province as a junior party of Imran Khan's PTI. The PTI then parted ways on suspicions of corruption by QWP ministers. After Qaumi Wattan Party parted ways from the KPK provincial government by Tehreek-e-Insaf of Imran Khan over corruption allegations, Sikandar Sherpao of QWP presented a letter to the media which was received from PTI Chairman Imran Khan advising to appoint a person named Khushal Khan as CEO of KPOGCL. PTI criticized QWP for such an act as the letter contained errors and the signature of Imran Khan was seen to be different from the original one. Shireen Mazari condemned the letter in a brief press release.

Relations began to improve between the two party and as of 2015, QWP rejoined the PTI provincial government and its ministers re-took the oath of office, this came amongst agreement between the parties to support non-corrupt government and resulted from QWP ministers not being charged of corruption by the Ehtesab Commission.

References

External links
 Official site
 Official Twitter
 Official Facebook

Social democratic parties in Pakistan
Pakistan People's Party breakaway groups
Pashtun nationalism